Louvières-en-Auge (literally Louvières in Auge) is a commune in the Orne department in north-western France.

The closest airport to Louvieres-en-Auge is Deauville Airport (56 km).

See also
Communes of the Orne department

References

Louvieresenauge